Ghost Son  is a 2007 Italian horror-thriller film, written and directed by Lamberto Bava and produced by Pino Gargiulo.

Plot
Stacey and Mark have recently married and are deeply in love with each other. They live on Mark's farm in South Africa. When Mark dies in a fatal car accident, the widow Stacey misses him and decides to stay with their orphan teenage maid, Thandi, on the farm. Later, her friend and doctor Doc finds that Stacey is pregnant. After a complicated delivery, Stacey notes that her baby in some moments seems to be possessed by the spirit of Mark, trying to kill her to bring her to spend eternity with him.

Cast
Laura Harring as Stacey
John Hannah as Mark
Pete Postlethwaite as Doc
Coralina Cataldi-Tassoni as Beth
Mosa Kaiser as Thandi
Susanna Laura Ruedenberg as pediatrician
Jake David Matthewson as Martin
Mary Twala as Leleti
Vanessa Cooke as gynecologist
Jeremiah Ndlovu as Bongani

References

External links

2007 films
2007 horror films
2007 thriller films
2000s horror thriller films
2000s ghost films
Films about spirit possession
Films set on farms
Films set in South Africa
Films directed by Lamberto Bava
Italian horror thriller films
Spanish horror thriller films
British horror thriller films
Uxoricide in fiction
2000s English-language films
2000s British films